Carlos Alberto Bustamante (born September 25, 1994) is a Mexican professional baseball relief pitcher for the Acereros de Monclova of the Mexican League.

Career

Tigres de Quintana Roo
On April 13, 2012, Bustamante signed with the Tigres de Quintana Roo of the Mexican League. In his debut season, Bustamante recorded a 4.50 ERA in 2 games with the team. In 2013, Bustamante posted a 3–0 record and 5.31 ERA in 40 appearances. The following season, Bustamante appeared in 11 games for the Tigres, struggling to an 8.10 ERA in 11 appearances. For the 2015 season, Bustamante pitched in 24 games for Quintana Roo, logging a 2–2 record and 2.84 ERA with 50 strikeouts in 66.2 innings of work.

Pericos de Puebla
On January 7, 2016, Bustamante was traded to the Pericos de Puebla of the Mexican League. He appeared in 49 games for Puebla in 2016, pitching to a 4–2 record and 4.24 ERA with 39 strikeouts in 51.0 innings pitched.

Arizona Diamondbacks
On June 21, 2017, Bustamante signed a minor league contract with the Arizona Diamondbacks organization. He split the year between the AZL Diamondbacks, the rookie-level Missoula Osprey, and the Single-A Kane County Cougars, posting a cumulative 0.31 ERA in 17 appearances. He split the 2018 season between the High-A Visalia Rawhide and Kane County, recording a 2–1 record and 4.84 ERA in 41 appearances between the two teams. On March 18, 2019, Bustamante was released by the Diamondbacks.

Acereros de Monclova
On April 3, 2019, Bustamante signed with the Acereros de Monclova of the Mexican League. In 47 games for Monclova, he registered a 2.57 ERA with 27 saves and 67 strikeouts, and earned Mexican League All-Star honors.

Philadelphia Phillies
On December 24, 2019, Bustamante signed a minor league deal with the Philadelphia Phillies organization. Bustamante did not play in a game in 2020 due to the cancellation of the minor league season because of the COVID-19 pandemic. Bustamante was released by the Phillies organization on May 29, 2020.

Acereros de Monclova (second stint)
On May 20, 2021, Bustamante signed with the Acereros de Monclova of the Mexican League.

International career
Bustamante was selected to the Mexico national baseball team at the 2020 Summer Olympics (contested in 2021).

References

External links

1994 births
Living people
Mexican expatriate baseball players in the United States
Tigres de Quintana Roo players
Mayos de Navojoa players
Pericos de Puebla players
Arizona League Diamondbacks players
Missoula Osprey players
Kane County Cougars players
Visalia Rawhide players
Acereros de Monclova players
Baseball pitchers
Baseball players from Sonora
People from Navojoa
Baseball players at the 2020 Summer Olympics
Olympic baseball players of Mexico